Alfred Louis Cannan MHK is an independent Member of the House of Keys for Ayre & Michael and is the current Chief Minister of the Isle of Man. He was previously the Minister for the Treasury.

Cannan sought the position of Chief Minister in 2011, but was unsuccessful. His nomination was the first ever in which only MHKs had a vote: previously the  members of the Legislative Council also took part in the election. Cannan replaced Howard Quayle, who was stepping down from his position and declined to run in the 2021 House of Keys election. On 12 October 2021, Cannan defeated Ramsey MHK Alex Allinson to become the Isle of Man's Chief Minister.

Political career

In 2011, Cannan was elected as MHK for the constituency of Michael, which was abolished in 2016.

Cannan's first government appointment was as chairman of the Civil Service Commission, serving from 2011 to 2014. In 2014 he was appointed chairman of the newly formed Manx Utilities Authority.

From 2015 to 2016 he was also a political member of the Department of Economic Development.

In 2016 he was elected as an MHK for the new constituency of Ayre & Michael, winning the highest number of votes in the two-member constituency.

Cannan was narrowly defeated by Howard Quayle in  the election of the Chief Minister, and was appointed Treasury Minister in October 2016. His term of office as Treasury Minister was marked by some significant decisions. In October 2017 Cannan wrote off £95m of debts owed by the Manx Utilities Authority; in February 2018 pension freedoms were controversially introduced; and in May 2018 the Isle of Man Government purchased the Isle of Man Steam Packet Company for £124.3m.

Cannan has been a strong advocate for reform of the National Health Service on the Isle of Man and was instrumental in initiating the review by Sir Jonathan Michael which has led to a proposed separation of policy and operations and the formation of a new delivery organisation named Manx Care.

He maintained that the focus of his budgets must be on "working families" and the challenge of dealing with a decade of low wage growth. His budgets saw significant rises in personal tax allowances alongside targeted above inflation welfare increases for low paid workers as well as child benefit.

In March 2020 Cannan delivered the economic package (https://www.youtube.com/watch?v=h2bqt9eEB9s) that was to sustain the Isle of Man through the COVID pandemic which included a salary support scheme and the Manx Earnings Replacement Allowance (MERA).  He established a cross government Economic Recovery Group which, amongst a number of initiatives, oversaw the formation of the Manx Development Corporation and launched a major review of the Isle of Man Economic Strategy.  

On 12 October 2021 he was elected as Chief Minister of the Isle of Man by the House of Keys.  In December 2021 he announced a major shift in the management of Coronavirus https://www.bbc.co.uk/news/world-europe-isle-of-man-59728056 and then in March 2022 the Government announced it would support the humanitarian effort in Ukraine by accepting refugees.

Electoral history

2011

2016 
In 2014, Tynwald approved recommendations from the Boundary Review Commission which saw the reform of the Island's electoral boundaries.

Under the new system, the Island was divided into 12 constituencies based on population, with each area represented by two members of the House of Keys.

As a result the constituencies of Ayre and Michael were merged.

2021 
{| class="wikitable" style="margin-right:1em; font-size:95%;"
|+ style="background-color:#f2f2f2; margin-bottom:-1px; border:1px solid #aaa; padding:0.2em 0.4em;" | General election 2021: Ayre & Michael
! scope="col" rowspan="2" colspan="2" style="width:15em;" | Party
! scope="col" rowspan="2" style="width:17em;" | Candidate
! scope="col" colspan="2"                     | Votes
|-
! scope="col"             style="width:4em;"  | Count
! scope="col"             style="width:6em;"  | Of total (%)

Personal life

Cannan was born in Reading, Berkshire, England, in 1968 and educated at King William's College, Isle of Man and Sandhurst before undertaking a short service commission with the Royal Regiment of Wales.

References 

Living people
Members of the House of Keys 2011–2016
Members of the House of Keys 2016–2021
1968 births
Chief Ministers of the Isle of Man